This is a list of gliders/sailplanes of the world, (this reference lists all gliders with references, where available) 
Note: Any aircraft can glide for a short time, but gliders are designed to glide for longer.

German miscellaneous constructors 
Agfa Dessau F.V / Maschinenbau-Schule Dessau
Akaflieg
Akaflieg Karlsruhe
AK-1
AK-2
AK-5
AK-5B
AK-8
AK-X
 Allgaier Geier – Josef Allgaier
 Andersson Datschi – A.J. Andersson
 ASW-12
 ASW-15
 ASW-17
 ASK-18
ASW-19
ASW-20
 ASK-21
ASW-22
 AS 22-2
ASK-23
ASW-24
ASH-25
ASH-26
ASW-27
ASW-28
ASG-29
ASH-30
ASH-31
ASG-32
AS 33
 Bachem Lerche – Erich Bachem
 Baden-Baden glider – Segelflugzeugwerke Baden-Baden
 Bahr (glider)
 Benz Be-2 – Ing. Hans Benz, Mönchen-Gladbach.
 Berliner Segelflugvereins 1923 primary
 Binder EB28 – Binder Motorenbau GmbH
 Binder EB29 – Binder Motorenbau GmbH
 Binder ASH-25 EB28 – Binder Motorenbau GmbH
Blessing Rebell – Gerhard Blessing
Blessing V-7 Gleiter-Max
Böhm Schmankerl
Bölkow Phoebus
Bonn Helge
Bonn I Vulkan
Bonn Schlägel und Eisen
Bremen-Lane
Bremer Max
Bremer Strolch
BS 1K
BSV 1923 glider- Berliner Segelflugverein
BSV Luftikus – Berliner Segelflugverein – HOHMUTH, Otto
Budig 1921 glider – Friedrich Wilhelm Budig
Waibel-Butler Concordia WAIBEL, Gerhard & BUTLER, Dick & BOERMANS, Loek & DILLINGER, Johannes
D-Helios aka Berlin HFS Helios – Heinz Kensche – NSDFK Ortsgruppe Berlin
D.D. Zögling – Hermann Aecherli & Willy Farner
Daimler L15 -H. Klemm – Daimler-Motoren-Gesellschaft Werke
Delta 1
Derwitzer
Der Dessauer
Dessau Agfa – Maschinenbau-Schule Dessau
Glaser-Dirks Flugzeugbau GmbH
DG-100 (Standard Class)
DG-200 (15 metre Class)
DG-300 (Standard Class)
DG-400 (Self-launching motor glider)
DG-500 (Two seater)
DG-600 (15 metre and 18 meter Class)
DG Flugzeugbau GmbH
DG-808C (15 metre and 18 metre)
DG-1001 (Two seater)
Erfurt Erfurt – Erfurter Verein für Luftfahrt e.V., Erfurt
Eta (glider)
Eta Biter
Etrich-Wels 1906 glider – Igo Etrich & Franz Wels
FAB 3 – Flugtechnische Arbeitsgemeinschaft an der Ingenieurschule Beuth
Fisher-Boretzki Fibo 2a – Hans Fischer & Boretzki
Focke-Wulf Kranich III
Freiherr von Lüttwitz glider
Fulda Erlkönig – Modell-und Segelflugverein, Fulda
Fulda Fulda – Modell-und Segelflugverein, Fulda
Glasfaser Nimeta – Nimbus 4 / Eta amalgam
Glasflügel 
Glasflügel BS-1
Glasflügel H-30 GFK
Glasflügel H-101 Salto
Glasflügel H-201 Standard-Libelle
Glasflügel H-301 Libelle
Glasflügel 202 Standard-Libelle
Glasflügel 203 Standard-Libelle
Glasflügel 204 Standard-Libelle
Glasflügel 205 Club Libelle
Glasflügel 206 Hornet
Glasflügel Hornet C
Glasflügel 303 Mosquito
Glasflügel 304
Glasflügel 401 Kestrel
Glasflügel 402
Glasflügel 604
Hansjörg Streifeneder Falcon
Gnewikow Gne-3 – Karl Gnewikow
Görlitz I – D. L. V.-Gruppe, Görlitz
Göttingen IV Niedersachsen – Flieger Ortsgruppe Göttingen
Graf von Saurma Milan
 Grob G102 Astir
 Grob G103 Twin
 Grob G104 Speed Astir
Gropp Zaunkönig – GROPP, Herbert
Günar 1
Haase-Kensche-Schmetz HKS-1
Haessler-Villinger HV-1 Mufli – man-powered – Helmut Haessler & Villinger
Hamborger Jung
Hamburg Störtebecker – Flugt. Verein Hamburg
Harbich Ha-12/ 49 Leopold Harbich developed from SG-38
Harth S-1 (Friedrich Harth)
Heide FS-16 Wippsterz – Heide
Heidelberg Kurpfalz Sauzahn – R. Ek & H. G. Bader Wagonfabrik Fuchs, Heidelberg
Heinkel Greif II – Heinkel Speyer – Ernst Heinkel A.G.
Heinkel He 162S
Helios (glider) – Hochschule für Schauspielkunst Berlin – (HFS Berlin)
Hentzens Maikäfer
HG-1 Tölpel
Hirth-Hütter Goevier III – Dipl.-Ing. Wolf Hirth/Wolfgang Hütter.
Hofmann Schloß Mainberg – H. Hofmann Kegel-Flugzeugbau, Kassel
HpH 304 – =HpH Ltd
Hoffmann H-36 Dimona – Wolf Hoffmann Flugzeugbau KG
Horten-Schäfer Aachen – designed by Reimar Horten & Schäfer_ built by Christiani Wassertechnik GmbH
Icaré 1 – Stuttgart University – Solar powered motorglider
Icaré 2 – Stuttgart University – Solar powered motorglider
Illerfalke
Junkers Ju 322 Mammut – Mammoth – Junkers Flugzeug-Werke A.G. Dessau
Jupp-Pitter
Ka-1
Ka-2
Ka-3
Ka-4
Ka-6
Ka-7
Ka-8
Ka-10
ASK 13
Kassel 1926 glider – PAUL, Fritz
Kegel III – Max Kegel
Kirchner Futurum
Kirchner Hessenland – Wilhelm Kirchner – Niederhessischer Verein für Luftfahrt
Kirchner La Pruvo – Wilhelm Kirchner at Kassel
Köhl Nurflügler – Hermann Köhl aka Koehl Ko-1
Kolibri-B – Sportverein Merseburg
Königsberg Lüwa III – Ostpreußischer Verein für Luftfahrt, Königsberg
Konrad Ko Ro-4 – F. Konrad – Konrad-Segelflugzeugbau, Rosenheim (Obb.)
Kortenbach & Rauh Kora 1 – designed by Schultes, Seidel and Putz
Krekel Grille – Paul Krekel- Hans H. Hünebeck, Metall- und Rohrbau, Duisburg.
Krüger Schlägel und Eisen – Hermann Landmann & Nowack
Ksoll Breslau – J. Ksoll
Ksoll Galgenvogel I – J. Ksoll
Ksoll Galgenvogel III – J. Ksoll
Kurten Sie3 – Siebert Sie3?
Langhammer L-10 Libelle – Egon Scheibe / Bitz-Linner-Zoller
Laubenthal Lore – Paul Laubenthal
LCF-II – Luftsport-Club Friedrichshafen
LFG Boot-Phönix – G. Baatz – LFG (Luftfahrzeug-Ges.), Stralsund
Lilienthal Hang Gliders
LO 120 S – LO-Fluggerätebau
Rolladen-Schneider Flugzeugbau 
LS1 (Standard Class)
LSD Ornith (two seater prototype)
LS2 (15 metre Class, though before the present classes existed)
LS3 (15 metre Class)
LS4 (Standard Class)
LS5 (22 metre prototype only)
LS6 (15 metre Class with optional tips to give 17.5 metres or 18 metre spans)
LS7 (Standard Class)
LS8 (Standard Class with optional tips to give 18 metre span)
LS9 (18 metre self-launching glider – 10 built)
LS10 (15 metre Class and 18 metre Class)
LS11 (Two Seater Class) – prototype in development by Akaflieg Köln9
Lutz Welu-48
Luty Ly-542 K Stösser – Lüty, Paul – Sportflugzeugbau, Hülserstrasse 398, Krefeld
M&D Flugzeugbau Samburo
Mähr.-Schönberg S. E. II – H. Kromer – Deutscher Fliegerbund, Mähr.-Schönberg
Markmann Mark-10
Martens Pegasus – A. Martens
Martens S – A. Martens
Meinigen
Meusel M-IV – Horst Meusel – Verein für Luftfahrt e.V., Zittau
Milbert Hansa – Milbert – Hamburger Flugzeugbau (?)
Milomei M1 Michael-Lorenz Meier
Milomei M2
Moazagotl – (Hirth ordered, Wenk designed, Schneider built)
Möller Stormann – Flugzeugbau Möller
Eichhorn Möwe – Eichhorn – NSFK Ortsgruppe Bielefeld
Nipp Bremen-Lane – Ernst Nipp
Niemcy Bräutigam
Nürnberg D-14 Doppeldecker – E. Ittner – Nordbayr. Luftfahrtverband, Nürnberg
Oller Dussel
Onigkeit 1938 glider – Otto Onigkeit
OziteThoenes, A. (?) – OZITE-Verkaufs GmbH
Pelzner C – Pelzner, Willy
Pelzner Hang Glider
Pelzner Hängegleiter 1920 – Willy Pelzner
Peyean Boot I – K. Peyean
Peyean Boot II – K. Peyean
Peyean Schwalbe – K. Peyean
Pflumm Schleppgleiter
Platz glider – Reinhold Platz
Richter Möwe – Hans Richter
Riedel PR-1 – Peter Riedel
Riedel PR-2 – Peter Riedel
Rostock M III – Kreckel, P. – Mecklenburgische Aero-Klub, Rostock'
Roter Vogel – Baumer Aero Company
Saurma-Jeltsch motor-glider
Schempp-Hirth
 Göppingen Gö 1 Wolf sailplane, 1935
 ...
 Göppingen Gö 9 development aircraft for Dornier Do 335 Pfeil, 1941
 Standard Austria sailplane line
 Schempp-Hirth SHK
 Cirrus
 Standard Cirrus
 Discus
 Discus-2
 Ventus
 Ventus-2
 Ventus-3
 Nimbus
 Nimbus-2
 Nimbus-3
 Nimbus-4
 Mini-Nimbus
 Janus
 Duo Discus
 Arcus
 Quintus
Schlesien in Not
Schmid MS-4 – M. Schmid
Schmid MS-5
Schmid S-1
Schröder-Peters SP-1 V1 – SCHRÖDER, Josef & Heinz Peters – Flugzeugbau Köhler/ Peters, Fulda
Schul-Marczinski Stadt Magdeburg
Schwarzwald-Flugzeugbau Donaueschingen Ibis (RLM 108–64)
Schwarzwald-Flugzeugbau Donaueschingen Strolch (RLM 108–62)
Seehase MD-2 – Hans Seehase
Seiler D-1
Siebert Sie-3 – designer Wilhelm Kurten – production Siebert
SM-5 (glider)
Stähls Lo 170 – Bodo Stähls
Steinleher-Huber SH-2H – Fritz Steinleher sen., Peter Huber
Strandpromenade
Strauber-Frommhold Mistral – Strauber-Frommhold GmbH
Sturm Super Orchidee – Bräutigam, Bernhard
Stuttgart I – P Brenner- Flugtechnischer Verein Stuttgart
Stuttgart II – P. Brenner & M. Schrenk – Flugtechnischer Verein Stuttgart
Thoenes Alexander-der-Kleine – A. Thoenes
Udet Alpensegler – 1927, design P.Zarbl, calculation Fritz Wertenson
Ursinus 1925 – URSINUS, Oskar – man-powered ornithopter
Wagener H.F.V. 17 Pirat – H. Wagener
Westpreussen (glider) – Heinrich Hofmann
WWS WM-1 – Wiegand und Wisser Sportflugzeugbau GmbH & Co. KG
Wimmer-Dewald Leonardo 2000 – Josef Immer & Alexander Dewald
Wind Wi-1 – Willy Wind
Windhund – Hohmuth-Konstruktion der Berliner Segelflieger
Württemberg (glider) – Wolf Hirth
Zeise-Nesemann Bird – Zeise & A. Nesemann
Zeise-Nesemann Senator – A. Nesemann
Zwickau Sorgenkind – Flugtechnischer Verein, Zwickau
Zeise 1921 MPA

Notes

Further reading

External links

Lists of glider aircraft